The following highways are numbered 370:

Canada
New Brunswick Route 370
Newfoundland and Labrador Route 370
 Quebec Route 370

Japan
 Japan National Route 370

United Kingdom
 A370 road

United States
  Interstate 370
  U.S. Route 370 (former)
  Arkansas Highway 370
  Colorado State Highway 370
  Georgia State Route 370
  Iowa Highway 370
  Maryland Route 370
  Missouri Route 370
  Nebraska Highway 370
  New York State Route 370
  Ohio State Route 370
  Oregon Route 370
  Pennsylvania Route 370
  Puerto Rico Highway 370
  Virginia State Route 370
  Wyoming Highway 370 (unsigned)